Melissa Ji-Yun Lee (born 1966) is a New Zealand politician. She was elected to the House of Representatives as a list MP for the National Party in the 2008 election. , she is the National Party's spokesperson for broadcasting, communications, digital media, and ethnic affairs.

Early life and career
Lee was born in South Korea and grew up in Malaysia before moving to Australia and then to New Zealand in 1988 with her family. She has a MA Hons (First Class) in Communication Studies. Based in Auckland, she spent twenty three years in journalism, including a five-year stint at the Sunday News and writing for numerous publications including The New Zealand Herald and The Listener.
She was also the producer of the TV magazine series, Asia Downunder.

Member of Parliament

In November 2008, Lee became a List MP in the New Zealand Parliament. Her maiden speech included sections in English, Māori, and Korean. In English, she mentioned crime, education, and anti-Asian racism issues in New Zealand. In the Māori section, she mentioned the history of Māori first coming to New Zealand by canoe from Hawaiki and compared it to her own migration to New Zealand by aeroplane. Near the end of her speech, she thanked, in Korean, all the people that had given her support "simply by virtue of [their] shared heritage".

Lee became the second Korean, and first Korean woman, to win the election to a non-Korean national legislature. (The first Korean elected to a foreign national-level office, Jay Kim, became a member of the United States House of Representatives in 1992.)

A poll conducted between 10 December 2008 and 19 April 2009 by the Spanish newspaper, 20 minutos (20 minutes) ranked Lee as the world's 51st most beautiful female politician.

First term and Mt Albert by-election, 2008–2011
During the first months of entering Parliament two Conscience votes were taken, Melissa Lee voted against the Misuse of Drugs (Medicinal Cannabis) Amendment Bill and the Liquor Advertising (Television and Radio) Bill.

On 16 April 2009, Lee announced her candidacy for the National Party nomination in the 2009 Mount Albert by-election. She defeated the previous local National candidate, Ravi Musuku, to win selection for the National Party on 4 May 2009.

On 13 May 2009, Lee told a candidates' meeting that the SH20 Waterview Connection could divert criminals from South Auckland away from the electorate. Lee apologised the next day, saying "if South Auckland people (find) my comments offensive, I apologise. It wasn't about them. It was about criminals." Prime Minister John Key later said the remark was a "stupid statement to make". Later that day she apologised again saying, "I apologise unreservedly for the comments I made regarding South Auckland... I sincerely regret my remarks." In the by-election, Lee attracted only 3,542 votes, coming a distant second to Labour's David Shearer's 13,260 votes.

During the by-election, allegations were made in May 2009 that Lee's production company Asia Vision had spent New Zealand on Air money making a promotional video for the National Party ahead of the 2008 election. Lee called the allegations "ridiculous", saying that all work on the video was done by volunteers. The Green Party referred the video to  the Electoral Commission, saying that it should have been declared as an election expense. An investigation conducted by New Zealand on Air later cleared Lee of the charge of misuse of funding.

Later in 2009, Lee used NZ$100,000 of contingency funding to increase the markup for Asia Downunder in violation of her contract with New Zealand on Air, which she described as "an innocent error".

In April 2011, Lee courted controversy when, after she had made a speech supporting the controversially rushed-through copyright law 92A, it emerged that hours earlier she had tweeted "Ok. Shower... Reading ... And then bed! listening to a compilation a friend did for me of K Pop. Fab. Thanks Jay" which appeared to contradict her stance on law 92A.

Second term, 2011–2014
During the 2011 general election, Melissa Lee increased her electoral vote in the Mt Albert electorate but failed to unseat David Shearer, who retained the seat by a margin of 10,021 votes.

On 20 December 2011, John Key announced that Lee and John Hayes would become Parliamentary Private Secretaries, a role not in use for several years. Key appointed her to the portfolio of Ethnic Affairs, given the heavy workload of Judith Collins as the newly appointed Minister of Justice. In January 2014, Lee was appointed Chairperson of the Social Services Select Committee.

There were several conscience votes during the 50th Parliament surrounding issues of the legal alcohol purchase age and Same-Sex Marriage. In these votes, Lee voted against the Marriage (Definition of Marriage) Amendment Act 2013 and voted in favour of retaining the Alcohol Purchase age at 18 in the Alcohol Reform Bill.

Third term, 2014–2017
During the 2014 general election, Melissa Lee failed to win the Mt Albert electorate. Her Labour opponent David Shearer retained the seat by 10,656 votes, a moderate decrease on the previous election but substantially increased the party vote, winning the party vote by 3,536.

After the 2014 election, Lee was appointed to Chair the Commerce Select Committee while also retaining her position as  Parliamentary Private Secretary for Ethnic Communities, the position being renamed to reflect the change in name of the eponymous Ministry and Minister, Lee has been joined by Jacqui Dean as a Parliamentary Private Secretary since the retirement of  John Hayes at the 2014 Election. Lee also has one Private Members Bill waiting to be drawn from the ballot: the Accident Compensation (Recent Migrants and Returning New Zealanders) Amendment Bill.

Fourth term, 2017–2020
During the 2017 general election in mid-September 2017, Melissa Lee was re-elected on the National Party List. Lee stood against Labour Party leader Jacinda Ardern in the Mt Albert electorate but was defeated by a margin of 15,264 votes. Following the formation of a Labour-led coalition government on 19 October 2017, the National Party became the main opposition party in Parliament. Lee is currently the National Party's spokesperson for broadcasting, communications, and digital media, and ethnic communities. She is also a member of the Economic Development, Science and Innovation select committee.

In March 2018, Lee challenged the Broadcasting Minister Clare Curran about her undisclosed meeting with Carol Hirschfield, the head of content at Radio New Zealand. Curran initially claimed the meeting had been coincidental but later admitted that it had been prearranged. Lee accused Curran of engaging in a cover-up.

In mid-September 2019, Lee raised the issue in Parliament about Asian children being denied measles vaccinations at their local clinic on the pretext that Māori and Pacific children were being given priority. In response, the Waikato District Health Board acknowledged that it was prioritizing Maori and Pacific children due to their lower vaccination rate and poorer health outcomes.

During the COVID-19 pandemic in New Zealand in mid-July 2020, Lee raised the plight of Dowook Kang, a six-year-old Korean child who was unable to attend school since his father, a temporary visa holder, was unable to return to New Zealand due to lock down travel restrictions. Under New Zealand law, international students under the age of ten are unable to attend schools without the presence of a parent or guardian. Education Minister Chris Hipkins declined to intervene, citing policy issues.

Fifth term, 2020–present
During the 2020 New Zealand general election, Lee contested Mount Albert and came second place behind Prime Minister Jacinda Ardern, who retained the seat by a final margin of 21,246 votes. However, Lee was able to return to Parliament via the National Party list.

Lee was one of only eight MPs to vote against the Conversion Practices Prohibition Legislation Act 2022.

References

External links

Melissa Lee – MP Profiles – NZ National Party
 New Zealand Parliament – Lee, Melissa

Living people
New Zealand National Party MPs
Women members of the New Zealand House of Representatives
New Zealand politicians of Korean descent
1966 births
Naturalised citizens of New Zealand
New Zealand list MPs
South Korean emigrants to New Zealand
Members of the New Zealand House of Representatives
21st-century New Zealand politicians
21st-century New Zealand women politicians
Candidates in the 2017 New Zealand general election